Hindrek Kesler (born 7 April 1958) is an Estonian architect.

Kesler was born in Kiviõli.  He graduated from the State Art Institute of the Estonian SSR in 1981.

Hindrek Kesler works in the architectural bureau Zero OÜ.

Works
 bus station of Sillamäe, 1998
 Estonian Gymnasium in Sillamäe, 2001
 office building in Mustamäe, 2002
 office building of the Luku-Expert company, 2006
 office of the architectural bureau Zero OÜ, 2007

References
 Union Of Estonian Architects, Chartered Architects V
 Architectural Bureau Zero OÜ, works

1958 births
Living people
People from Kiviõli
Estonian architects